"No Favors" is a song by Temper. The song went to number one for one week on the Billboard disco/dance chart in 1984. The single also peaked at #64 on the R&B chart.

"No Favors" was written and produced by Cleveland Wright III and Anthony Malloy.

References

1984 singles
1984 songs
MCA Records singles